Gapyear.com is a gap year social network based in the United Kingdom. Built around a travel community, its members engage in the site through blogs, events, messageboards and photos. It provides advice, ideas and opportunities  on everything related to gap years and backpacking, including information on planning your trip, destinations, volunteering, and working abroad. It is also described as a travel advice website.

History
Tom Griffiths published Before You Go in 1997, a book about planning your gap year, and went on to win The Times's Young Travel Writer of the Year award.

Griffiths went on to create The Gap Year Company Ltd. in July 1998 with IT consultant Peter Pedrick.

The website was initially launched as thegapyear.co.uk, which became gapyear.co.uk in 1999, and gapyear.com in 2000.

As a media spokesperson for gapyear.com and the gap year industry, Griffiths became a prominent figure in the media.

In 2005, gapyear.com worked with Advance Payment Solutions (APS) to launch the Gap Year Cashplus Prepaid MasterCard, a first for the backpacker travel market.

Gapyear.com played a role in defining the underlying principles of Fair Trade Volunteering, worked with Way Out Experiences (WOX) to launch The Great Volunteer Project and built a long-running relationship with Connexions to help give advice to students during A-level clearing.

In 2010, gapyear.com became a part of Flight Centre, Ltd.

Gapyear.com magazine
In 2012 gapyear.com relaunched the gapyear.com magazine (it was initially launched in 2000), available in UK schools, colleges, universities and Flight Centre stores.  The publication is an extension of the brand and offers readers advice, ideas and inspiration on gap year travel.

Awards
 British Youth Travel Awards 2007 – Best Website (winner)
 British Youth Travel Awards 2008 – Best Website (finalist)
 British Youth Travel Awards 2008 – Most Innovative Marketing (finalist)
 British Youth Travel Awards 2009 – Best Website (finalist)

References

External links
 

British social networking websites